Rita Wolf (born Rita Ghose) is an American British actress born in Kolkata, India.

US theatre credits include premieres of work by Tony Kushner ("Homebody/Kabul" at NY Theatre Workshop, also at BAM) and Richard Nelson ("The Michaels" at The Public Theatre and "The Michaels Abroad" at Hunter College). She was nominated for a Drama Desk Award for her role in "The American Pilot" by David Greig at Manhattan Theatre Club and appeared most recently with NAATCO in "Out of Time" at The Public Theatre directed by Les Waters.  Wolf moved from Kolkata, India to London as a child and began her professional acting career with Joint Stock Theatre Company at The Royal Court Theatre, London in Hanif Kureishi's Borderline.  She appeared on British television and in several London theatre productions, including the first professional production of pioneering S. Asian Theatre Company Tara Arts, then had her first leading film role in Retake Film and Video Collective's 1984 movie Majdhar, where she played, Fawzia a young Pakistani woman in 1980's Britain. Since then, she has had major parts on stage and screen in both the United States and the United Kingdom. After playing Tania in Kureishi/ Stephen Frears' My Beautiful Laundrette, she had television roles in Albion Market, Coronation Street, Tandoori Nights, Farrukh Dhondy's Romance, Romance, Calling the Shots, and Wing and a Prayer. She also  appeared in Jack Gold's film The Chain, Steven Lisberger's Slipstream and Pratibha Parmar's Khush.

In 1989, Wolf and writer Rukhsana Ahmad founded the Kali Theatre Company in London, a registered charity that has a goal to encourage, develop, promote and produce the works of Asian female writers. Wolf directed the company's first production, Song for a Sanctuary, written by Ahmad. Kali is supported in part by grants from the Arts Council of England.

Wolf has lived in New York City for three decades. As a child, her daughter, Anjeli Chapman had a major role in the independent film The War Within. Her son, Kiran Chapman was featured as a child in A Heartbeat to Baghdad, a play about the Iraq War at The Flea Theatre NYC.

Filmography 
 Majdhar (1984) as Fawzia Khan
 The Chain (1984) as Carrie
 My Beautiful Laundrette (1985) as Tania
 Slipstream (1989) as Maya
 Khush (film) (1991)
 Girl 6 (1996)
 Second Generation (2003)

Television 
 Wing and a Prayer (UK)
 Calling the Shots (UK)
 Coronation Street (UK) (1990) as Felicity 'Flick' Khan
 Law & Order (US)
 Tandoori Nights (UK)
 The Good Wife (US)

Theatre 
 Borderline
 Homebody / Kabul
 The House of Bernarda Alba
 The American Pilot
 Chaos Theory
 An Ordinary Muslim
 The Michaels
 Out of Time

References 

BBC: "The bbc.co.uk Guide to Comedy", accessed 15 October 2005
The Kali Theatre: "About Us: The People: Rita Wolf", accessed 14 October 2005
The New York Times: "The New York Times: Movies: Rita Wolf", accessed 15 October 2005
The American Pilot

External links 
 

1960 births
Living people
Indian emigrants to the United Kingdom
British actresses of Indian descent
British people of Bengali descent
Actresses from Kolkata
British theatre managers and producers
Women theatre managers and producers